Pierre Roger Valdemar Thorsson (born 21 June 1966) is a Swedish handball player who competed in the 1992 Summer Olympics, in the 1996 Summer Olympics and in the 2000 Summer Olympics.

He was born in Linköping.

In 1992 he was a member of the Swedish handball team won the silver medal in the Olympic tournament. He played six matches and scored 25 goals.

Four years later he was part of the Swedish team which won the silver medal again. He played six matches and scored 30 goals.

At the 2000 Games he won his third silver medal with the Swedish team. He played five matches and scored 13 goals.

External links
profile

1966 births
Living people
Swedish male handball players
Olympic handball players of Sweden
Handball players at the 1992 Summer Olympics
Handball players at the 1996 Summer Olympics
Handball players at the 2000 Summer Olympics
Olympic silver medalists for Sweden
Swedish expatriate sportspeople in Germany
Olympic medalists in handball
Medalists at the 2000 Summer Olympics
Medalists at the 1996 Summer Olympics
Medalists at the 1992 Summer Olympics
Sportspeople from Linköping
Sportspeople from Östergötland County